The Royal Suspension Chain Pier was the first major pier built in Brighton, England. Opened on 25 November 1823, it was destroyed during a storm on 4 December 1896.

History
Generally known as the Chain Pier, it was designed by Captain Samuel Brown , with construction starting on 18 September 1822 and completing in September 1823, opening on 25 November 1823. Brown had completed the Trinity Chain Pier in Edinburgh in 1821. The pier was primarily intended as a landing stage for packet boats to Dieppe, France, but it also featured a small number of attractions including a camera obscura. An esplanade with an entrance toll-booth controlled access to the pier which was roughly in line with the New Steine. Turner and Constable both made paintings of the pier, King William IV landed on it, and it was even the subject of a song.

The Chain Pier co-existed with the later West Pier, but a condition to build the Palace Pier was that the builders would dismantle the Chain Pier. They were saved this task by a storm which destroyed the already closed and decrepit pier on 4 December 1896. Some of the debris from the pier damaged the then under construction Palace Pier and the Daddy Longlegs railway.

The remains of some of the pier's oak piles could be seen at low tides around 2010, however, as of 2021, they are no longer visible. Masonry blocks can still be seen. The signal cannon of the pier is still intact, as are the entrance kiosks which are now used as small shops on the Palace Pier.

Gallery

See also
National Piers Society
List of piers in the United Kingdom

References

External links

Pictures and Drawings of the pier - from "Science and Society Picture Library"
Photographs of the pier
My Brighton and Hove resources related to the pier
thisbrighton.co.uk - Brighton's Piers History
Brighton Chain Pier and Remains (flickr gallery)

Piers in Sussex
Buildings and structures in Brighton and Hove
Chain piers